Tony De Pauw is a Belgian businessman. He is chief executive officer of WDP Warehouses De Pauw NV in Wolvertem with an estimated fortune of 95.2 million euro.

Sources
 De rijkste families in Vlaams-Brabant
 WDP (EuroNext)

Year of birth missing (living people)
Living people
Belgian businesspeople
Place of birth missing (living people)